Executive is an English language monthly business magazine published in Beirut, Lebanon. The magazine is one of the major publications concerning economic and financial matters across the Middle East and North Africa (MENA) region.

History and profile
Executive was established in 1999. The magazine is published in Beirut on a monthly basis. Yasser Akkaoui is the editor-in-chief of the monthly, which covers articles on business and finance as well as on social, economic and cultural news in Lebanon.

In 2010 Executive became a member of the Business Publications Audit (BPA) Worldwide.

See also
List of magazines in Lebanon

References

External links
 Official website

1999 establishments in Lebanon
Business magazines
English-language magazines
Executive
Magazines published in Beirut
Monthly magazines published in Lebanon